Gun laws in Iowa regulate the sale, possession, and use of firearms and ammunition in the state of Iowa in the United States.

Iowans may now buy and carry handguns without first getting a permit, after a new law went into effect on July 1, 2021.

Iowans no longer need to have state permits to buy or carry firearms in most public places. Iowans may still opt to seek a state-issued permit completed by their local sheriff, which is valid for five years upon approval.  Obtaining this permit proves useful, as the permit is valid in states with permit reciprocity.

Prior law, which was changed:

On January 1, 2011, Iowa became a "shall issue" state for a permit to carry weapons on one's person. This applies to both open carry and concealed carry.
Applicants must successfully complete an approved training course. The permit is valid for 5 years. On July 1, 2021, Iowa became a constitutional carry state allowing for both open and concealed carry without a permit by both residents and non-residents.

Iowa will honor any valid permit issued by any other state. Persons do not have to be a resident of the state from which the permit was issued.

A Permit To Acquire (PTA), obtained from the sheriff of the county of the applicant's residence, is available to skip the background check before purchasing firearms. A PTA shall be issued to qualified applicants aged 21 or older. The PTA becomes valid three days after the date of application, and is valid for five years. Starting July 1, 2021, a PTA is no longer required to purchase a handgun in the state of Iowa. They are still available, however, as they may be used to substitute a NICS background check.

Iowa has enacted state preemption of firearms laws, so local units of government may not restrict firearms.

Under Iowa law, private citizens may not possess automatic firearms, any firearm "other than a shotgun or muzzle loading rifle, cannon, pistol, revolver or musket" with a bore of more than 6/10 of an inch (unless it is an antique made in or before 1898), or any explosive, incendiary or poison gas destructive device., short-barreled rifles (barrels under 16 inches), and short-barreled shotguns (barrels under 18 inches) may be possessed if federally registered.

Summary table

Additional Iowa laws table

References

External links
Weapon Permits at Iowa.gov
Chapter 724 Weapons at Legis.Iowa.gov
Iowa House HF756 at Legis.Iowa.gov

Iowa law
Iowa